The Albania national under-23 football team represents Albania in international football at this age level and is controlled by Albanian Football Association, the governing body for football in Albania. The team competed in the UEFA European Under-23 Championship & Balkan Youth Championship, but after the rule change in 1975s, the event had an age limit of 21.

History

Balkan Youth Championship

Albania Under-23 participated in the Balkan Youth Championship tournaments from 1969 until 1976 when the age limit rule changed to the under-21 and then Albania participated with the Albania national under-21 football team. In two first tournament 1969 & 1970, Albania U23 was ranked 3rd out 5 national teams participations in both occasions. Then in the 1971 & 1972 tournament they were ranked in the 4th place in both cases. They withdrew from the 1973 tournament and in the 1974 edition, Albania U23 managed to reach the final after winning Group B against Turkey U23 & Greece U23. In the final they lost 1–0 against Romania U23.

UEFA European Under-23 Championship
Albania U23 participated in 2 out 3 UEFA European Under-23 Championship in 1972 & 1974 where they were eliminated in both cases in the qualifying stages.

1991 Mediterranean Games

Group stage – Group B

1997 Mediterranean Games

Group stage – Group B

Players individual records

Top appearances

Top goalscorers

Competitive record

UEFA European Under-23 Championship Record

Balkan Youth Championship Record

*Denotes draws include knockout matches decided on penalty shoot-out.
**Gold background colour indicates that the tournament was won.

Mediterranean Games - Football

See also
 Albania national football team
 Albania national under-21 football team
 Albania national under-20 football team
 Albania national under-19 football team
 Albania national under-18 football team
 Albania national under-17 football team
 Albania national under-16 football team
 Albania national under-15 football team
 Albania national football team results
 Albania national youth football team
 Albanian Superliga
 Football in Albania
 List of Albania international footballers

References

External links
Tournament archive at UEFA.com
UEFA U-23 European Championship at RSSSF.com

under-23
European national under-23 association football teams
Football in Albania